Megasemum asperum is a species of beetle in the family Cerambycidae. It was described by John Lawrence LeConte in 1854.

References

Spondylidinae
Beetles described in 1854